Morioka Jajamen is a local cuisine of Morioka, Iwate Prefecture. It is one of the Three Great Noodles of Morioka, along with Morioka Reimen and Wanko soba. It is based on Zhajiangmian from China.

History
Before World War II Takashina Kanshou (高階貫勝) visited Manchukuo, now Northeast China, and ate Zhajiangmian. In 1945 he returned to his hometown in Morioka and brought the dish with him. He recreated the miso paste many times on his return and incorporated the opinions of his customers to create a taste that was popular with the people of Morioka. It eventually evolved into its own unique dish that is now a speciality of Morioka with many restaurants and izakayas offering it.

Overview
Morioka Jajamen uses a thin udon noodle. It is served with a scoop of meat miso which is a combination of minced pork, onion, dried shitake mushrooms, water, vegetable oil, sake, garlic, ginger, miso, mentsuyu, sugar, black ground sesame, and sesame oil. It is then garnished with cucumber, spring onions, and ginger. After mixing the dish vinegar, chilli oil, or garlic can be added to taste.

Chitantan

Near the completion of the dish, the eater may decide to turn it into Chitantan. With the remaining sauce and a few noodles, a raw egg is cracked into the bowl. Boiling water is added to cook the egg and mix with the remaining sauce. Additional meat miso or condiments can be added to taste.

For more information see Sino-Japanese vocabulary.

Zhajiangmian
Zhajiangmian is the inspiration for Morioka Jajamen, but has many differences. While Morioka Jajamen is a very uniform dish, zhajiangmian has many varieties.  The type of noodles can be varied depending on region. As well the main sauce used differs from the Japanese miso base and instead uses sweet bean sauce.

Korea also has their own unique variant of zhajiangmian called Jajangmyeon (자장면).

See also
 Zhajiangmian
 Jajangmyeon

References

Japanese Chinese cuisine
Japanese cuisine